Gilberto González (1906 - 21 March 1954) was a Mexican actor. He appeared in more than ninety films from 1933 to 1954.

Biography
Gilberto González was born in 1906 in México City, México. After several attempts, in 1933 he found a spot as an extra in the film [[
Su última canción]]. In his third film (Janitzio (1935)) he gets the antagonistic role, which made life impossible for the protagonist, played by Emilio “Indio” Fernández. It is thanks to this role that he was offered multiple films, where he usually appeared as the main villain. He appeared in more than ninety films from 1933 to 1954.

Among the films in which he acts, Rebel Souls (1937) stands out, where three of the future pillars of Mexican cinema made their debut: Raúl de Anda, Alejandro Galindo and Víctor Manuel Mendoza, as producer, director and actor respectively; The Bandits of Cold River (1938), Sota, horse and king (1944), in which Luis Aguilar made his debut, Canaima (1945), alternating with the most famous couple of that time: Jorge Negrete, Gloria Marín and with the queen of melodrama Charito Granados, which thanks to them he receives the Ariel Award for the best actor in a minor role, La selva de Fuego (1945) with the diva Dolores del Río and Arturo de Córdova, The Pearl (film) (1947) with Pedro Armendáriz, although he didn't play a big role in this film, it is arguably the most famous movie he appeared in. The Pearl is about a Mexican driver, named Quino, who discovers a very valuable pearl that is worth thousands at the bottom of the ocean. In the village they live, multiple people try to retrieve that pearl but dealers continuously rip them off, and others try and aggressively steal it. Quino's brother suggest they leave the village, but Quino struggles with the decision because he is trying to give his son an education. Captain from Castile (1947), his first experience in Hollywood in a small role, La vorágine (1949), La malquerida (1949), which stands out for the duel of divas: Dolores del Río - Columba Domínguez, La Possession (1950) with Jorge Negrete and Miroslava, Vino el remolino y nos alevantó (1950), El suavecito (1951), Víctor Parra's consecrating film, Subida al cielo (1952) in which it is directed by Luis Buñuel, Now I'm Rich (1952), an intense drama starring Pedro Infante and Marga López, El bombero atómico(1952), one of his few comedy appearances, which is about a clumsy fireman, named Cantinflas, who gets a visit from his goddaughter, whose mother recently died in the jungle. The firemen becomes a policeman for safety reasons, and there life is smooth until gangsters kidnap his goddaughter. Next are Cantinflas and El rebozo de Soledad (1952), for which he would get his last Ariel nomination.

His last film appearance would be in The Littlest Outlaw (1954), a film directed by Roberto Gavaldón in the United States for Disney. The Film is about a peasant boy who steals an abused and beautiful stallion. Together they go through an adventure filled journey full of tense confrontation and danger. This journey portrays Mexicos rugged beauty. He died on March 21, 1954, due to a heart attack in Palenque (Chiapas), Mexico.

Awards

Ariel Award

Selected filmography

References 

https://movies.disney.com/the-littlest-outlaw
https://www.imdb.com/title/tt0037981/plotsummary?ref_=tt_ov_pl

External links 

1906 births
1954 deaths
Mexican male film actors